The German Langshan is a breed of chicken developed from the exported Croad Langshan in Germany. It is a large, robust breed of exceptional height. Though most often raised for show, it has practical application as a layer and meat bird, as well. The standard-sized German Langshan is uncommon in both the United States and the United Kingdom, but the bantam form is popular in the latter.

History 

The Croad Langshan was first shipped to the United Kingdom in 1969, and thence to Germany. Along with the Minorca and Plymouth Rock, the Croad Langshan was used in the creation of the German Langshan. Through selective breeding, this resulted in a brown-tinted fowl, distinctly different from other Langshan varieties which are normally only recognised as having white, black or blue feathering. The German Langshan's creation was completed by the early twentieth century.

Appearance 

The German Langshan is a large, heavy chicken: roosters weigh about 9 pounds or 4 kilograms. The chickens have a contoured back and a relatively small tail. With its long legs and upright posture the breed's profile is often likened to a wine glass. They have a single comb. As said above, their legs are bare.

Colors 

The German Langshan is most often found in only three colours: Black, Blue, and White; others are known, but are rather rare.

Characteristics 

German Langshans are strong, vital chickens that grow up fast. They lay cream-colored eggs which are quite large. Their weight hinders flight. They can be tamed without much difficulty.

See also
 Australian Langshan
 Croad Langshan
 Modern Langshan
 List of chicken breeds

References

Chicken breeds
Chicken breeds originating in Germany
Animal breeds on the GEH Red List
Langshans